The article lists the people of importance from (or related to) the city of Guntur of the Indian state of Andhra Pradesh.

Citizens
Ambati Rayudu - Famous Indian cricketer from VELLALURU village,so many his  followers  celebrate during his match...
Dhulipala- Motion Pictures
Jagarlamudi Kuppuswamy- Philanthropist
Konda Venkatappayya- Freedom fighter, Philanthropist
Maddi Sudarsanam- Freedom Fighter, Philanthropist, Politics and Industrialist
Mukkamala- Motion Pictures
S. V. L. Narasimham- Trade Union activist, First MP of Guntur City

Film industry
Ghattamaneni Krishna- Owner of Padmalaya studios
Jamuna- Actress
Koratala Siva- Director
Savithri- Actress
Viswanath- Director, Actor
Posani - writer, Actor
Brhamanandam - Actor
Gummadi - Actor
Sunitha - singer
Mano - singer
S janaki - singer
Chakravarthy - music composer
Boyapati Srinu- Director
Krish Jagarlamudi- Director
K.S.Ravindra- Director
Shivaji Sontineni- Actor

Entrepreneurs
Kallam Anji Reddy-Founder Chairman Dr Reddy labs.
Velagapudi Ramakrishna-KCP cements

Politics

Chief ministers
Tanguturi Prakasam Panthulu- Former Chief Minister Andhra Pradesh
Bhavanam Venkatarami Reddy- Former Chief Minister Andhra Pradesh
Kasu Brahmananda Reddy- Former Chief Minister Andhra Pradesh
Nadendla Bhaskar Rao- Former Chief Minister Andhra Pradesh
Konijeti Rosaiah- Former Chief Minister Andhra Pradesh

Central ministers
Kotha Raghuramaiah-Former Central minister
Pamulapati Ankineedu Prasad-Former Central minister
Ummareddy Venkateswarlu-Former Central minister

Assembly Speakers
Alapati Dharma Rao-Former Assembly speaker Andhra Pradesh
Kona Prabhakar Rao-Former Assembly speaker Andhra Pradesh
Nadendla Manohar- Former Assembly speaker Andhra Pradesh

Home Ministers
Alapati Dharma Rao- Former Home minister Andhra Pradesh
Kodela Siva Prasada rao-Former Central minister

Members of Parliament
S.M.Laljan Basha- Former Member of parliament [Loksabha and Rajyasabha]

References

Guntur
Guntur-related lists